Jameh Mosque of Kashmar, the place where Jumu'ah is performed, was built in Kashmar in 1791 by Fath-Ali Shah Qajar. This Mosque is opposite the Amin al-tojar Caravansarai.

Imams and speakers 
 Hassan Borhani, Imam of Friday Prayer
 Seyed Kazem Tabataba'i, Imam of Friday Prayer
 Mohsen Rezaee, lecture on March 17, 2013

Gallery

See also 
 Arg of Kashmar

References 

Kashmar
Mosques in Iran
Mosque buildings with domes
Buildings and structures in Kashmar
National works of Iran
Tourist attractions in Razavi Khorasan Province
18th-century mosques